Spaghetti alla carrettiera is a pasta dish originating from the Platani River Valley and is now more common in eastern Sicily. It is generally made with spaghetti, garlic, chili pepper, pecorino siciliano or breadcrumbs, parsley, and olive oil for dressing, and commonly tomato is added. Sometimes additional ingredients like anchovies, capers, almonds or pine nuts and white wine are also included. The oral tradition is that the pasta dish originated with carters who brought the dish prepared in advance, on their wagons for lunch.

See also

List of Sicilian dishes
List of pasta dishes

References

Cuisine of Sicily
Pasta dishes